Walter Wolfrum (23 May 1923 – 26 August 2010) was a German military aviator who served in the Luftwaffe during World War II. As a fighter ace, he flew 424 combat missions and claimed 137 aerial victories—that is, 137 aerial combat encounters resulting in the destruction of the enemy aircraft. This ties him for 43rd place among highest scoring fighter aces. He was also a recipient of the Knight's Cross of the Iron Cross, the highest award in the military and paramilitary forces of Nazi Germany during World War II.

Career
On 10 May 1944, Wolfrum was appointed Staffelkapitän (squadron leader) of 1. Staffel of Jagdgeschwader 52 (JG 52—52nd Fighter Wing), succeeding Oberleutnant Karl-Heinz Plücker who was killed in action. On 20 May, Wolfrum claimed six aerial victories, an "ace-in-a-day" achievement. He became a double "ace-in-a-day" following eleven aerial victories on 30 May 1944. The next day, he again claimed six aircraft shot down, again making him an "ace-in-a-day". On 1 June 1944, Wolfrum was credited with his 100th aerial victory. He was the 74th Luftwaffe pilot to achieve the century mark. On 16 July, Wolfrum again became a double "ace-in-a-day" when he claimed ten aircraft shot down in combat near Kamionka, northeast of Lviv. Following these ten victories, he was severely wounded requiring a lengthy period of convalescence. In consequence, Oberleutnant Manfred Eberwein was given command of 1. Staffel.

On 31 August 1944, Oberst (Colonel) Dietrich Hrabak, Geschwaderkommodore (wing commander) of JG 52 submitted a report, requesting a preferential promotion for Wolfrum to Oberleutnant (first lieutenant). The application was seconded by General Hans Seidemann, commander-in-chief of the VIII. Fliegerkorps, on 8 September. The request was approved and the promotion backdated to 1 September. At the end of the war, Wolfrum surrendered to the US 90th Infantry Division.

After the war he became a successful aerobatics pilot, winning the German Championship in 1962 and taking second place in 1961, 1963, 1964 and 1966.

Hans-Ulrich Rudel
According to Wolfrum's own account, he and Hans-Ulrich Rudel were in contact in the first years following the end of World War II. The two had briefly met twice during the war. Wolfrum's girlfriend Irene Rühl had a friend who worked for the Americans as a secretary at a hospital in Fürth where Rudel was being treated. With the help of this friend, Rudel's release papers were signed and he was set free. Wolfrum states that he then periodically aided Rudel as a motocycle driver and courier. Additionally, Wolfrum's father helped Rudel's father, Johannes Rudel, find a new home and position as a pastor in Gunzenhausen. At the time, Rudel was getting in contact with his former comrades from Schlachtgeschwader 2. With the aid of these comrades, Rudel had set up a smuggling ring across the various zones of Allied-occupied Germany. The official currency in Germany at the time was still the Reichsmark and its exchange rate varied from zone to zone. Rudel and his men built an illegal business, disguised as a haulage company, around this discrepancy in exchange rates by smuggling large sums of money from one zone to another, buying and selling currency with a profitable margin. Wolfrum states that his contact with Rudel ended in 1948 after Rudel had left for Argentina.

Summary of career

Aerial victory claims
According to US historian David T. Zabecki, Wolfrum was credited with 137 aerial victories. Mathews and Foreman, authors of Luftwaffe Aces — Biographies and Victory Claims, researched the German Federal Archives and state that Wolfrum was credited with 134 aerial victories, plus sixteen further unconfirmed claims. All of his victories were claimed on the Eastern Front.

Victory claims were logged to a map-reference (PQ = Planquadrat), for example "PQ 34 Ost 76891". These sectors were then subdivided into 36 smaller units to give a location area 3 × 4 km in size.

Awards
 Eastern Front Medal
 Iron Cross (1939)
 2nd Class (28 July 1943)
 1st Class (22 September 1943)
 Wound Badge (1939) in Gold
 Front Flying Clasp of the Luftwaffe for Fighter Pilots in Gold (22 July 1943)
 Honour Goblet of the Luftwaffe on 24 April 1944 as Leutnant and pilot
 German Cross in Gold on 18 May 1944 as Leutnant in the 5./Jagdgeschwader 52
 Knight's Cross of the Iron Cross on 27 July 1944 as Leutnant and pilot in the 5./Jagdgeschwader 52

Notes

References

Citations

Bibliography

External links

1923 births
2010 deaths
Luftwaffe pilots
German World War II flying aces
Recipients of the Gold German Cross
Recipients of the Knight's Cross of the Iron Cross
Aerobatic pilots
Military personnel from Bavaria
People from Kronach (district)